Shadowman or Shadow Man may refer to:

Film
 Streets of Shadows (1953 film), released as Shadow Man in the U.S.
 Shadow Man (1988 film), a Dutch-British film with Tom Hulce
 Shadow Man (2006 film), a 2006 Steven Seagal film
 Shadow Man (2014 film), an Indian film
 Shadowman (2017 film), a 2017 documentary about street artist Richard Hambleton
Nuits Rouges or Shadowman, a 1974 film by Georges Franju

Television
"The Shadow Man", a 1985 episode of The Twilight Zone directed by Joe Dante
"Shadowmen", a 1992 episode of The Young Riders

Video games
Shadow Man (video game), a 1999 video game by Acclaim Entertainment loosely based on the comic book
Shadow Man: 2econd Coming, a 2002 sequel
Shadow Man, a boss in Mega Man 3

Music
Shadowman (Steve Walsh album), 2005
Shadowman (Link Wray album)
Shadow Man (Johnny Clegg & Savuka album), 1988
 Shadow Man (Tim Berne album)
"Shadow Man" (song), a song written by David Bowie in 1971
"Shadow Man", a song by the Afro Celt Sound System from Volume 3: Further in Time

Literature
Shadowman (comics), a comic book series and character from Valiant Comics
Shadowman, a 1993 horror novel by Dennis Etchison
Shadow Man, a 1996 science fiction novel by Melissa Scott

Other
Shadowman paintings, street art shadow paintings made by Richard Hambleton in New York City in the early 1980s

See also
Shadow people, creatures of both modern folklore and paranormal popular culture